Carlos Calderón (born 24 January 1947) is a Mexican épée and foil fencer. He competed at the 1968 and 1972 Summer Olympics.

References

External links
 

1947 births
Living people
Mexican male épée fencers
Olympic fencers of Mexico
Fencers at the 1968 Summer Olympics
Fencers at the 1972 Summer Olympics
Fencers from Mexico City
Pan American Games medalists in fencing
Pan American Games bronze medalists for Mexico
Fencers at the 1971 Pan American Games
Fencers at the 1975 Pan American Games
Mexican male foil fencers
20th-century Mexican people